Ulpia Severina was Roman empress as the wife of Roman emperor Aurelian from  270 to 275. Severina is unmentioned in surviving literary sources and known only from coinage and inscriptions and as a result, very little is known about her. Her  Ulpia suggests that she may have been related either to Emperor Trajan (r. 98–117) or the usurper Laelianus (r. 269), as they share the same nomen, and perhaps from Dacia, where the name was common. It is not known when she married Aurelian, but it might have been before he became emperor. She was probably proclaimed  in the autumn of 274.

Aurelian was murdered in September/October 275 and his successor, Tacitus, was proclaimed emperor only after a brief interregnum, lasting somewhere between five and eleven weeks. Though coins of Severina were minted under Aurelian from 274 to 275, some historians speculatively assign certain unusual types of coins to this brief interregnum period and suggest that Severina either effectively briefly ruled the empire in her own right, or that there was confusion in regards to Aurelian's successor until Tacitus became emperor, and coin mints thus chose to mint coins in Severina's name. Given that no literary source discusses Severina, any interpretation of the unusual coins remains speculation.

Early life and family 
Very little is known of Ulpia Severina given that no surviving literary source discusses her at all. Her year of birth is not known. Through conjecture, it is possible to assume that Severina came either from Dacia or one of the other Danubian provinces, as the  Ulpia had been common there ever since the conquests of Emperor Trajan. Severina may have been related to the usurper Laelianus.

It is not known when she married Aurelian, possibly it was before he became emperor, and nothing is known of her role as empress and her political influence. These were probably minted before she was made . No coins styling Severina as  can be dated before 274 and it is possible that she was not made  until the autumn of that year, perhaps around 29 August, coinciding with Aurelian's triumph celebrating the defeats and reincorporations of the Palmyrene and Gallic empires.

After the autumn of 274, coins commemorating Severina were issued together with those commemorating Aurelian; some coins included the profiles of both. On the coins, Severina is depicted in a typical way for her time, with braided hair drawn up over the back of her head and an austere expression. Typically, her coins include the goddess Concordia, though some instead feature the goddesses Venus and Juno, the standard deities for empresses. Severina survived beyond Aurelian's murder in 275 and the date of her death is unknown. Aurelian and Severina had a daughter together, though her name is unknown.

Dowager empress

Interregnum 

Aurelian died in September or October 275, murdered by his own officers after his secretary, afraid of being punished for a small lie, convinced them that the emperor intended to put them to death. Aurelian's successor, Tacitus, was proclaimed emperor in November or December. According to their accounts, this period consisted of the army in Thrace, worried as they were complicit in Aurelian's murder, and the Roman Senate repeatedly petitioning each other to elect a successor.

Contemporary documentation from Egypt suggests that the interval was at the most only 10 or 11 weeks, and perhaps as short as just 5 weeks. If accounting for the time it took for the news of Aurelian's death to reach Italy, and the information to spread out into the empire from there, the interval of the supposed interregnum is very brief. The Epitome of Histories by the 12th-century historian Joannes Zonaras mentions an "interregnum" between Aurelian and Tacitus, but he likely used the 4th-century Enmannsche Kaisergeschichte as a source, wherein the term "interregnum" more probably referred to the time between Aurelian and Probus, regarding the briefly reigning emperors Tacitus and Florianus as sorts of "inter-regents". Other ancient historians, such as Eusebius, are known to sometimes have regarded Tacitus and Florianus as too insignificant to count. Despite the dismissal of a lengthy interregnum as fantasy, and the lack of unequivocal evidence for any extended interregnum at all, many historians still believe that there was a brief interregnum of some sort, often citing spurious numismatic (coin-based) evidence. Some coinage once thought to have been minted in the period between Aurelian and Tacitus, bearing the legend  and sometimes the letters  (interpreted as indicating the Roman Senate assuming control of the government between the reigns of the two emperors), have recently been re-assigned to the earlier reign of Gallienus.

Severina's status 

Some scholars supporting the notion of an interregnum between Aurelian and Tacitus have turned to speculating based only on numismatic evidence that the Roman Empire was governed, at least nominally, by Severina until Tacitus became emperor. Though many numismatists view Severina's tenure as  ruler of the empire as beyond dispute, it is only speculation and there are serious doubts with the interpretation given that it is only based in the interpretation of certain coins and that literary sources are entirely silent on the matter. Based on the increasing quantity of her coinage towards the end of Aurelian's reign, it has been argued that some coins were minted of Severina also after Aurelian's death, though Alaric Watson, author of a biography on Aurelian, dismissed this argument since he found it based more in a desire to find coins supposedly dating to the interregnum rather than the actual features of the coinage. According to the numismatist David L. Vagi, Severina ruling the empire for an extended interregnum "does not appear to be based in historical fact", though her coins may have been issued at a few mints in the weeks between Aurelian's death and Tacitus's accession.

The coins most widely suggested to have been minted under Severina's supposed tenure as ruler of the empire bear the legend  and depict the goddess Concordia holding two legionary standards, interpreted as Severina perhaps working to retain the loyalty of the soldiers. No similar coins were issued with the name of Aurelian, taken by some to mean that they were minted after his death. A handful of coins also bear the legend . That it is the singular  (Augusta/Augustus) used rather than the plural  (Augusti) is a striking detail that may perhaps hint at them being minted at a time when Severina was the sole ruler. Though they are highly unusual, a problem with attributing these coins to after Aurelian's death is that most agree that such issues were minted in Antioch, Rome and Ticinum, but not in the Balkans and other eastern cities (which had never minted any coins in Severina's name but would have been the first places to hear of Aurelian's death). It is possible that some of the coins of Severina were minted after Aurelian's death, but that in of itself does not necessarily mean that she ruled in her own right since it is also possible that the time it took to name Aurelian's successor led to a period of confusion, and that some coin mints thus simply continued to mint coins recognizing Severina.

References

Bibliography 

 

 

 
 

3rd-century Roman empresses
Crisis of the Third Century
Ulpii
Augustae
Aurelian
3rd-century women rulers